Santa María Nduayaco is a town and municipality in Oaxaca in south-western Mexico. The municipality covers an area of  km². 
It is part of the Teposcolula District in the center of the Mixteca Region.

As of the 2010 census, the town, which serves as the municipal seat, had a population of 57 inhabitants, while the municipality had a total population of 550 inhabitants. Its municipal seat is the second-smallest (to Santa María del Rosario) in all of Mexico.

References

Municipalities of Oaxaca